Bijar Sar (also Romanized as Bījār Sar; also known as Bodzhyarser, Bojār Sar, and Bojiarser) is a village in Chubar Rural District, Ahmadsargurab District, Shaft County, Gilan Province, Iran. At the 2006 census, its population was 512, in 141 families.

References 

Populated places in Shaft County